Le Kevin Smith (born July 21, 1982) is a former American football defensive tackle of the National Football League (NFL), who played five seasons from 2006-2010.  He was drafted by the New England Patriots in the sixth round of the 2006 NFL Draft.  Smith was a member of the Patriots' 2007 16-0 team and recorded half a sack during Super Bowl XLII. He ended his NFL career in 2010 with the Denver Broncos. He played college football at Nebraska.

Early years
Smith attended Stratford Academy in Macon, Georgia, where he helped Stratford win three Class 3A titles state titles as a defensive lineman. He was the USA Today Georgia Player of the Year and was a Rivals.com All-American. He also lettered in track and field, winning four state titles in the discus and two in the shot put.  It is noted that during his senior year, the Macon Telegraph called him the "real deal" after he dominated rival Tattnall Square Academy's star center Brandon Dillard.

College career
After graduating from high school, Smith attended the University of Nebraska. After redshirting in 2001, Smith played in all 14 games in 2002. As a sophomore in 2003, Smith started all 12 games at defensive tackle, recording 44 tackles. He moved to nose guard in 2004, and was an All-Big 12 honorable mention after recording 43 tackles and 2.5 sacks. In his 2005 senior season, Smith set a career high with six sacks while starting all 11 games at defensive tackle. He finished his college career with 36 tackles for a loss, the second-highest total for a defensive lineman in Nebraska history. Smith graduated with a degree in Construction Management.

Professional career

New England Patriots
Smith was drafted by the New England Patriots in the sixth round (206th overall) in the 2006 NFL Draft. He was inactive or did not play in all but three games of his rookie season in 2006. He appeared in 13 games in 2007, seeing time as a reserve defensive lineman and on special teams. Smith was active for 15 games in 2007, recording a career-high 14 tackles. He also was a member of the Patriots' kickoff return unit, which blocked for Ellis Hobbs' 96-yard return against the Oakland Raiders in Week 15. The biggest play of his career came during Super Bowl XLII when Smith recorded half a sack on Eli Manning. Smith recorded a career high 14 tackles during the 2008 season. On August 17, 2009, Smith's career as a Patriot came to an end when he was traded to the Denver Broncos on the last day of training camp. Smith ended his career with the Patriots totaling 28 tackles and 1 fumble recovery in 31 games played.

Denver Broncos
Smith was acquired by the Denver Broncos on August 17, 2009 along with a seventh-round pick in the 2010 NFL Draft for the Broncos' fifth-round pick in the 2010 draft. Smith recorded 10 tackles and 1 sack during the 2009 season. He was released on September 7, 2010, re-signed in late October  before being cut once more on November 9.

Retirement
During the 2011 lockout, Smith went to his doctor for a "random MRI test".   Unfortunately, the doctor told Smith that he had sustained a neck injury and found 3 bulging spinal disc and spinal cord damage at his C3/C4. In April 2012 Smith had an Anterior Cervical Discectomy and Fusion. Four months after surgery, Smith fully recovered from the neck fusion. Doctors said he could go back to physical training and exercise, but he could never play football again because he was a lineman and would put himself at too much risk of permanently damaging his spinal cord and cause Tetraplegia (Paralysis from the neck down). Smith informed the NFL about his retirement and is no longer a player for the league.

References

External links
Denver Broncos bio
New England Patriots bio
Nebraska Cornhuskers bio

1982 births
Living people
Sportspeople from Macon, Georgia
Players of American football from Georgia (U.S. state)
American football defensive tackles
American football defensive ends
Nebraska Cornhuskers football players
New England Patriots players
Denver Broncos players